Backbone  is a noir role-playing indie video game developed by EggNut and published by Raw Fury. It was released for Microsoft Windows in June 2021, for PlayStation 4, PlayStation 5, Xbox One and Xbox Series X/S in October 2021, and on Nintendo Switch in February 2022. A prequel, titled Tails: The Backbone Preludes, was released in February 2023 on Windows.

Plot 
Set in a dystopian version of Vancouver, Canada populated by anthropomorphic creatures, Backbone follows Howard Lotor, a raccoon and private detective tasked with solving mysteries.

Reception 

The game was awarded with the Gran Prix, Best PC Game and Best Art categories at the DevGAMM Unreal Engine competition in Minsk, Belarus, and with the Best Indie Game Award at the Strasbourg European Film Festival in France.

References

Further reading

External links 
 Official website

2021 video games
Adventure games
Detective video games
Dystopian video games
Indie video games
Kickstarter-funded video games
Nintendo Switch games
PlayStation 4 games
PlayStation 5 games
Raw Fury games
Role-playing video games
Single-player video games
Unreal Engine games
Video games about raccoons
Video games set in Vancouver
Video games with Steam Workshop support
Video games developed in Canada
Windows games
Xbox One games